Elias Lönnrot (9 April 1802 – 19 March 1884) was a Finnish physician, philologist and collector of traditional Finnish oral poetry. He is best known for creating the Finnish national epic, Kalevala, 
(1835, enlarged 1849), from short ballads and lyric poems gathered from the Finnish oral tradition during several expeditions in Finland, Russian Karelia, the Kola Peninsula and Baltic countries.

Education and early life

Lönnrot was born in Sammatti, in the province of Uusimaa, Finland, which was then part of Sweden. He studied medicine at the Academy of Turku. The Great Fire of Turku coincided with his first academic year. As the university was destroyed in the fire, it was moved to Helsinki, the newly established administrative center of the Grand Duchy and the present capital city of Finland. Lönnrot followed and graduated in 1832.

Early medical career
Lönnrot lived in the village of Paltaniemi, when he got a job as district doctor of Kajaani in Eastern Finland during a time of famine and pestilence in the district. The famine had prompted the previous doctor to resign, making it possible for a very young doctor to get such a position. Several consecutive years of crop failure resulted in losses of population and livestock. In addition, lack of a hospital further complicated Lönnrot's work. He was the sole doctor for 4,000 or so people, most of whom lived in small rural communities scattered across the district. As physicians and novel drugs were expensive at the time, most people relied on their village healers and locally available remedies. Lönnrot himself was keen on traditional remedies and also administered them. However, he believed strongly that preventive measures such as good hygiene, breastfeeding babies and vaccines were the most effective cures for most of his patients.

Linguistics work

He began writing about the early Finnish language in 1827 and began collecting folk tales from rural people about that time. In 1831, the Finnish Literature Society was founded, and Lönnrot, being one of the founder members, received financial support from the society for his collecting efforts.

Lönnrot went on extended leaves of absence from his doctor's office; he toured the countryside of Finland, Sapmi (Lapland), and nearby portions of Russian Karelia. This led to a series of books: Kantele, 1829–1831 (the kantele is a Finnish traditional instrument); Kalevala, 1835–1836 (the "old" Kalevala); Kanteletar, 1840; Sananlaskuja, 1842 (Proverbs); an expanded second edition of Kalevala, 1849 (the "new" Kalevala). Lönnrot was recognised for his part in preserving Finland's oral traditions by appointment to the Chair of Finnish Literature at the University of Helsinki in 1853.

He also undertook the task of compiling the first Finnish-Swedish dictionary (Finsk-Svenskt lexikon, 1866–1880). The result comprised over 200,000 entries, and many of the Finnish translations were coined by Lönnrot himself. His vast knowledge of traditional Finnish poetry made him a definite authority in Finland and many of his inventions have stuck. Finnish scientific terminology was in particular influenced by Lönnrot's work and therefore many abstract terms that have a Latin or Greek etymology in most other European languages appear as native neologisms in Finnish. Examples from linguistics and medicine include kielioppi (grammar), kirjallisuus (literature), laskimo (vein) and valtimo (artery).  This may be well contrasted with the so-called inkhorn debate of English, in which proponents of Saxon-based words were largely defeated.

Work in botany
Botanists remember him for writing the first Finnish-language Flora Fennica – Suomen Kasvisto in 1860; in its day it was famed throughout Scandinavia, as it was among the first common-language scientific texts. The second, expanded version was co-authored by Th. Saelan and published in 1866. The Flora Fennica was the first scientific work published in Finnish (instead of Latin). In addition, Lönnrot's Flora Fennica includes many notes on plant uses in between descriptions of flower and leaf.

Impact

The Finnish graphic artist Erik Bruun used Lönnrot as a motif for the 500 markka banknote in his banknote series.

The coat of arms of Sammatti has a maple leaf in the middle of it (lönn means 'maple' in Swedish).

Don Rosa's story "The Quest for Kalevala" featuring Scrooge McDuck and Donald Duck has a cameo by Lönnrot.

Based on Elias Lönnrot's fame as a researcher, the Argentine author Jorge Luis Borges used the name Lönnrot for the diligent detective in his story, Death and the Compass (La muerte y la brújula), which was also made into a film by Alex Cox.

The Kalevala, the Finnish national epic that Lönnrot compiled, was among the inspirations for J. R. R. Tolkien's the Silmarillion and The Lord of the Rings.

Elias Lönnrot has been the main motif for a recent commemorative coin, the Finnish Elias Lönnrot and folklore commemorative coin, minted in 2002. On the reverse, a feather (as a symbol of an author) and Elias Lönnrot's signature can be seen.

The main belt asteroid 2243 Lönnrot was named after Lönnrot.

Ellen Kushner's short fantasy story 'The Threefold World' features Elias Lönnrot as the protagonist.

Gallery

Publications

See also

Day of the Finnish Language

Notes

References

External links

 

 Lönnrot, Elias Biografiskt lexikon för Finland 

1802 births
1884 deaths
People from Lohja
Finnish philologists
Linguists from Finland
Mythopoeic writers
Finnish naturalists
19th-century Finnish botanists
Finnish lexicographers
Finnish folk-song collectors
Swedish Lutheran hymnwriters
Finnish folklore
Finnish Lutheran hymnwriters
Recipients of the Pour le Mérite (civil class)
Karelian-Finnish folklore
Paremiologists
19th-century Lutherans
19th-century lexicographers
Lutheran poets
19th-century musicologists